The Spectral Sorrows is the third studio album by the Swedish death metal band, Edge of Sanity, recorded by Börje Forsberg in July–August 1993 and released by Black Mark Production in 1993. The bassist Anders Lindberg could not record the album due to mandatory military service.

This album begins Edge of Sanity's progression from pure death metal to a more progressive and melodic death metal sound. There's more focus on clean vocals than the album's predecessor, specifically on their cover of "Blood of My Enemies" by Manowar and "Sacrificed", the latter showing more of a cleanly-sung rock style.

The cover art was done by artist Dan Seagrave.

Track listing

Personnel
Edge of Sanity
 Dan Swanö - Vocals, Piano, Guitars
 Benny Larsson - Drums, Percussion
 Sami Nerberg - Guitars
 Andreas Axelsson - Guitars, Bass, Vocals (on 2, 7, 12)

Production
 Dan Swanö - Engineering
 Åsa Jonsén - Photography
 Dan Seagrave - Artwork
 Peter in de Betou - Mastering
 Börje Forsberg - Executive producer
 Maren Lotz - Layout, Graphics

Edge of Sanity albums
1993 albums
Albums with cover art by Dan Seagrave